Kelantan-Pattani Malay (in Pattani;  in Kelantan) is an Austronesian language of the Malayic subfamily spoken in the Malaysian state Kelantan, Besut and Setiu in Terengganu, and the southernmost neighboring province Thailand. It is the primary spoken language of Thai Malays, but is also used as a lingua franca by ethnic Southern Thais in rural areas, Muslim and non-Muslim and the Sam-Sam, a mostly Thai-speaking population of mixed Malay and Thai ancestry.

Kelantan-Pattani Malay is highly divergent from other Malay varieties because of its geographical isolation from the rest of the Malay world by high mountains, deep rainforests and the Gulf of Thailand. In Thailand, it is also influenced by Thai.

Kelantanese-Pattani Malay is distinct enough that radio broadcasts in Standard Malay cannot be understood easily by native speakers of Kelantan-Pattani Malay, such as those in Thailand, who are not taught the standard variety of the language. Unlike Malaysia where Standard Malay is compulsory in the school curriculum, no one is required to learn Standard Malay in Thailand and so there is potentially less language influence from Standard Malay but potentially more from Thai. It is also distinct from Kedah Malay, Pahang Malay and Terengganu Malay, but those languages are much more closely related to the Kelantanese-Pattani Malay language.

Names
The language is often simply just called  in Pattani.

It is also known as the Kedah Hulu dialect (in Kedah) and the Perak Hulu dialect (in Perak) but these two terms only apply to political and geographical factors rather than linguistic ones. This Reman variant has many dialects and subdialects across the areas where this variant is spoken.

Writing system
Kelantanese Malay is written both in Latin and in the Jawi alphabet, a writing system based on the Arabic script. Today, Pattani Malay itself is generally not a written language, though it is sometimes written in informal settings. When writing is needed, an old-fashioned form of standard Malay is used rather than the local dialect. A phonetic rendering of Pattani Malay in the Thai alphabet has been introduced, but it has not been met with much success, due to the socio-religious significance of Jawi to Muslim Malays.

History
Southern Thailand has continued to be a region affected by two cultural spheres: the mainly Buddhist, Thai-speaking Siamese kingdoms and the mainly Muslim, Malay-speaking sultanates. The region was a warehouse of trade where merchants from Europe, India, Arabia, China, Siam, and other parts of the Malay world met. At first dominated by Hindu-Buddhist Indian influences, the great kingdom of Srivijaya would later fall in chaos. Islam was introduced by Arab and Indian traders in the 11th century and has been the dominant religion ever since, replacing the Buddhism and Hinduism that had held sway before. By the 14th century, the area became vassals to Ayutthaya, but the region was autonomous and never fully incorporated into the modern Thai nation-state until 1902. This political autonomy and isolation from the rest of the Malay world allowed for preservation of the Malay language and culture but also led to the divergence of the dialect.

Variation
Kelantan-Pattani Malay can be divided into three major variants and several dialects (and a few subdialects):

Kelantan: Coastal (Narathiwat, Besut dialects), Central / River, Dabong / Inland

Pattani: Yala, Saiburi, Bana Taning, Chenok / Chana, Nonthaburi / Bangkok

Reman: Grik, Sik, Baling, Padang Terap, Batu Kugho / Selama, Southern Yala

 The Reman variants of Kedah and Perak show some vocabulary influence from Perak Malay and Kedah Malay (e.g.  ('you'),  ('you'),  ('brag/show off'), etc.).

Creole/Pidgin: Samsam Malay (a mixed language of Thai and Pattani Malay spoken by those of mixed Thai-Malay ancestry)

Distribution
Kelantanese is spoken in the Malaysian state of Kelantan, as well as in Besut and Setiu districts of Terengganu and the Perhentian Islands. It is also spoken in the Merapoh township, in the Lipis district of Pahang since this town borders the state of Kelantan.

Many people in the districts of Baling, Sik and Padang Terap in Kedah as well as the Hulu Perak district of Perak speak Kelantan-Patani language of Reman dialects, since most of the Malay people there are the descendants of Kelantanese migrants and Pattani refugees (in which whereby these regions were once parts of the Reman Kingdom of Pattani).

Pattani Malay is the main language of the Thai provinces Narathiwat, Yala and Pattani where ethnic Malays make up the majority of the population, it is also spoken in parts of Songkhla and Bangkok.  It is less spoken in the province of Satun, where despite making up the majority, ethnic Malays generally speak Southern Thai and their Malay dialect is similar to Kedah Malay. It is also spoken in scattered villages as far north as Hat Yai. In the past, Malay was the main language as far north as the Isthmus of Kra, the traditional division between Central Thailand and Southern Thailand, based on the preponderance of etymologically Malay place names.

Phonology
There are 21 consonants and 12 vowels in Pattani Malay. The phonemes  and  only appear in some loanwords or proper names.

Consonants

Vowels 

Note(s):

 The close central unrounded vowel  is believed to actually be a schwa  according to Teoh (1994) and Adi Yasran (2005)
 Before a final  and final  coda and in open-ended words,  is pronounced as:
 Open back unrounded  according to Adi Yasran (2006, 2010) and Zaharani (2006)
 Open-mid back rounded  according to Nawanit (1986)
 Near-open central  according to Teoh (1984)
 Many such as Adi Yasran (2010) and Teoh and Yeoh (1988) believe that the nasal vowels of Kelantan-Pattani Malay do not count as phonemes

Comparison with Standard Malay
Kelantan-Pattani Malay is different enough from Standand Malay that it is often unintelligible to speakers of the standard language. Differences include some differences in vocabulary, and different sound correspondences. The influence of Southern Thai and the Kelantan-Pattani Malay in Pattani upon each other is great, and both have large numbers of loanwords from the other. The influence of the Thai language makes comprehension between the Pattani variety of Kelatan-Pattani Malay and Standard Malay a bit more difficult than comprehension between the Kelantanese variety of Kelantan-Pattani Malay and Standard Malay.

Vowels

Consonants

Vocabulary 

Note(s):

 The spelling used for the Kelantan-Pattani Malay words is an eye dialect.

Gemination 
Gemination occurs for various purposes and in various forms in Kelatan-Pattani Malay.

Initial syllable reduction 
These geminations are derived by deleting the initial syllable and replacing it with a geminated form of the initial consonant of the remaining word.

 From simple words
   >  'woman'
   >  'to give'

 From prefixed words
   >  'to walk'
   >  'to stand up'

Initial morpheme reduction 
These geminates are derived by deleting the initial morpheme of a reduplicated word and replacing it with a geminated form of the remaining morpheme. Unlike the geminations acquired from initial syllable reduction, these geminates are not free variants of their Standard Malay counterparts.

 From the reduplicated form of a word
   >  'well'
   >  'properly'

 From words that are reduplications of a single word
   >  'kite'
   >  'tortoise'

Functional word reduction 
In this situation, a word with a function is deleted and the word afterwards is geminated. This sort of gemination is a free variant of its Standard Malay counterpart.

 From a verbal linker
   >  'to wash clean'
   >  'to keep something so it'll grow long'

 From preposition reduction
   >  'to/at/from the shore'
   >  'since the morning'

Loanwords 
Many loanwords tend to have initial geminated consonants too.

   >  'tar'

Stress 
Kelantan-Pattani Malay has a set of stress rules that is quite different to that of Standard Malay.

Words with initial simple consonants 
Generally, in Kelantan-Pattani Malay, the primary stress falls on the last syllable if the word starts with a single consonant.

   >  'to want'
   >  'in'
   >  'restless'

However, in words with more than one syllable, syllables with a schwa  are unstressed.

   >  'afternoon'
   >  'back'

Syllables that do not have the schwa and are not in the word-final position take the secondary stress.

   >  'path'
   >  'food'

Words with geminated consonants 
If a word has an initial syllable with a geminated consonant, that syllable automatically takes the primary stress.

   >  'to walk'
   >  'to/at/from the shore'

References

Citations

Bibliography 

 
 
 
 
 
 
 
 

Agglutinative languages
Languages of Malaysia
Languages of Thailand
Malay Peninsula
Peninsular Malaysia
Southern Thailand
Malay-based pidgins and creoles
Malay dialects
Malayic languages